The Henderson family is a Canadian family of Scottish ancestry from Clan Henderson in Scotland.  The family patriarch William Henderson emigrated from Scotland to Canada in 1872.

History 
William Henderson was born in Lonmay, Aberdeenshire, Scotland and emigrated to Ottawa in 1857-58, where he found work on the construction of parliament.  He moved back to Scotland in 1861 and married his first wife Mary Jane Smith, who he had three children with while in Scotland.  In 1872 he moved back to Ottawa and was eventually transferred west to British Columbia.  His son Stuart and daughter moved to British Columbia while his son Gordon remained in Ottawa.

William Henderson (February 26, 1837-September 24, 1931) m. Mary Jane Smith (1862-1904), Caroline D'Aguilar (1917-1931)
Stuart Alexander Henderson (September 19, 1863-February 17, 1945) m. Alice London (1890-), Mary Jane Losh (1904-)
Dr. Gordon Smith Henderson KC (July 10, 1866-July 16, 1938) m. Charlotte Stratton
Gordon F. Henderson CC QC (April 17, 1912 – August 17, 1993) m. Joan Parkins (1942-1993)
Joanne Nelson (1946) m. Robert Nelson (nephew of Sir Richard Nelson)
Meredith Nelson
Gregor Nelson
Gordon Nelson
Gordon Henderson
Stuart Henderson
Kate Henderson
Elizabeth Henderson
Robert Henderson
Ceilidh Henderson
Meghan Henderson
Quinn Henderson
Mary Jane Henderson (December 23, 1870-August 13, 1919) m. William Cruckshank, Claude Rogers

Notable Family members 
 William Henderson: William Henderson was born in Scotland and emigrated to Canada in 1872. At the time of his retirement in 1925, he was the Resident Architect of the Dept. of Public Works for British Columbia.  He was an Alderman and later a reeve for Oak Bay. Henderson was also the Grand Master of the Masonic lodge of British Columbia.
 Stuart Alexander Henderson: Stuart Alexander Henderson was a Defense lawyer who defended over 60 clients, most notably Gunanoot.  He represented Yale as a member of the Legislative Assembly of British Columbia.
 Gordon Smith Henderson KC: Gordon Smith Henderson was a Defense lawyer in Ottawa.  He ran for the Legislative Assembly of Ontario, unsuccessfully, twice.

 Gordon F. Henderson CC QC: Gordon F. Henderson was an intellectual property lawyer who was the chairman of Gowlings Law Firm.  He was the president of the Canadian Bar Association and the Chancellor of the University of Ottawa.  He was the honorary Consul General to Liberia in Canada and reportedly had 90 cases in front of the Supreme Court of Canada. He was a Companion of the order of Canada and the 1988 recipient of the B'nai B'rith award of Merit.  He is noted for his Philanthropy and his dedication to humanitarian causes.
 Stuart Henderson: Stuart Henderson is a Canadian Historian, culture critic, and film producer with 90th Parallel Productions.  He is the author of multiple books and his academic work has appeared in numerous journals.

References 

Canadian families
Canadian families by ethnic or national origin
Scottish-Canadian families